Gramsci Melodic was an alternative rock band based in Pittsburgh, PA.
The band was started in 2006 by singer/guitarist Martin Rubeo. Other members include Joel York (synthesizers/programming), Sean Rayl (drums), Greg Haduch (keyboards), and Tony Willoe (bass/vocals). In 2009, Eric Granata started to perform at some shows with the band, playing guitar, synths, and percussion. He became a full time member shortly after. 

The band won the 2008 Joker Productions Rock Off and recorded its first full-length album with Grammy Award winning producers at Audible Images. The band featured guitar, bass, piano, drums, and synthesizers. The band was ranked as Pittsburgh's #2 Best Underground Band and #3 Best Rock Band by The Pittsburgh City Paper in 2008. In 2009, Gramsci Melodic was named #3 Best Rock Band by The Pittsburgh City Paper.

The band released its self-titled, debut album in June, 2009. Collected, an album of previously unreleased material and live tracks, was released in 2021. 

Their music has been described as "simple and upbeat rock," "driving synth rock," "'70s funk" with "eclectronica," and similar to Fountains of Wayne, They Might Be Giants, and Weezer.

Gramsci Melodic was known to travel with its own mascot, a dancing character with an oversized green head.

See also
List of people from Pittsburgh
List of synthpop artists

References

External links
 Official Band Site

Alternative rock groups from Pennsylvania
Musical groups from Pittsburgh